"Equinox" is a two-part episode of the science fiction television series Star Trek: Voyager, the cliffhanger between the fifth and sixth seasons. This television episode features a 24th-century spacecraft, the USS Voyager, lost on the opposite side of the Galaxy as Earth, the Delta Quadrant, and they must make their way home.

In this installment, they encounter another Starfleet starship, the USS Equinox also stranded in the Delta Quadrant. This was presented in two parts, but aired several months apart, with part one airing on UPN on May 26, 1999 and the conclusion on September 22, 1999.

The cliffhanger closed out season five, while the opener for season six was the conclusion. The two-part episode features Captain Ransom, played by actor John Savage, as well as several other guest stars.

Part 1 is also the last episode of Star Trek: Voyager to air before the Star Trek: Deep Space Nine series finale, "What You Leave Behind". The broadcast of Part 2 in September 1999 marked the first time since 1992 that only one Star Trek series was on the air.

Plot

Part 1
The crew of the USS Voyager is surprised to receive an emergency hail from another Federation starship, the Equinox, in the Delta Quadrant. They arrive to find the damaged ship under attack by nucleogenic lifeforms. Under advice from the Equinox captain, Rudy Ransom, Captain Kathryn Janeway has Voyager extend its shields around both ships, quelling the attack, though the creatures continue to bear down on the shields, weakening them over time.

Janeway and Ransom discuss how both their ships had been pulled into the Delta Quadrant, five years earlier, by The Caretaker. Ransom shares that they found a wormhole and made enhancements to their warp engines, explaining how this allowed the smaller and slower Equinox to travel the same 40,000 light years as Voyager on its return to Earth. Of Ransom's crew, only 12 are still alive.

While surveying, Voyagers crew finds an area of the ship they cannot access due to intentional overrides by the Equinox crew. Janeway sends the holographic Doctor to the area, where he finds the Equinox crew has been harvesting bio-energy from the nucleogenic creatures, slaughtering dozens of creatures just to enhance their warp drive, traversing 10,000 light years in two weeks.

The Equinox crew know that they can reach Earth within weeks if they use more murdered creatures. They then attack Voyager stealing a shield generator and escape, kidnapping Seven of Nine along the way. Voyager, unable to raise shields, suddenly finds itself under attack from the angry nucleogenic creatures.

Part 2
Seven has encrypted the codes accessing the Equinox warp controls, delaying their plan to murder another 63 aliens for fuel. After learning the Doctor in their sickbay is from Voyager, and erasing his ethical sub-routines as they did with their EMH, they tell him to probe Seven's brain to obtain the codes, despite the fact this may permanently incapacitate her. During the Doctor's preparations, he idly sings "Oh My Darling, Clementine" in a duet with the partially incapacitated Seven, much dismaying Ransom as he suddenly sees her in more human terms.

Janeway starts taking the objective of stopping Ransom to extremes. She orders torpedoes to be fired on the Equinox, nearly kills an Equinox crew member during an interrogation, tractor beams an Ankari ship to strong-arm their cooperation, and relieves Chakotay from command when he questions her orders.

Ransom starts to realize the error of his ways and orders the crew to return the Equinox to Voyager, but the remaining crew, except for Ensign Marla Gilmore, attempt to mutiny against this. With Gilmore's help, Ransom transports part of the crew, as well as the Doctor and Seven, back to Voyager, while the remaining mutineers are killed by the aliens. After transporting Gilmore to Voyager, Ransom stays behind, sacrificing himself to pilot the ship far enough away from Voyager to protect it from the resulting explosion.

As Voyager resumes its journey home, Janeway reinstates Chakotay to Commander and strips the five surviving Equinox crew members of their ranks while integrating them with Voyagers crew. Seven promises to help the Doctor secure his ethical sub-routines from being deleted in the future.

Reception
In 2011, Cinema Blend rated this the best episode of Star Trek Voyager.

In 2013, Slate magazine ranked Captain Ransom one of the ten best villains in the Star Trek franchise, and that the episode was one of the best also.

Gizmodo ranked the "Equinox" pair 23rd out of the top 100 Star Trek episodes in 2014. The Hollywood Reporter ranked Equinox 30th best out all Star Trek episodes in 2016, and it was ranked the second greatest Star Trek: Voyager episode behind the Season 4 two-parter "Year of Hell". In 2015, SyFy rated it among the top ten of Voyager episodes. In 2017, Space.com rated "Equinox" as the ninth best Star Trek episode overall.

In 2017, Radio Times ranked this the sixth best episode of Star Trek, especially for those unfamiliar with the franchise.

In Wireds Star Trek: Voyager binge-watching guide for the show, they recommended not skipping "Equinox".

In 2018, CBR ranked the "Equinox" pair as the 11th best episodic saga of Star Trek overall.

A regional newspaper of Cleveland ranked "Equinox" as the 25th greatest episode of Star Trek (prior to Star Trek: Discovery''').

In 2018, TheGamer ranked it as one of the 25 creepiest episodes of all Star Trek series. They found the alien attackers to be "lethal, vengeful… and they never give up."

In June 2019, "Equinox" was rated tenth best of all Star Trek episodes up to that time by Screen Rant. (By 2016 there was 726 episodes of Star Trek television before Star Trek: Discovery) They note the two-part episode for highlighting the struggle to maintain morality in difficult circumstances, including how to maintain morale, and the dangers of greed. They point out the episode explores concepts of trust and self-interest in difficult circumstances, such as Voyagers 75-year journey back to Earth after being cut-off from Starfleet.

In 2020, SyFy Wire ranked "Equinox" the ninth best episode of Star Trek: Voyager; they said that the plot was worthy of a movie and keeps the audience guessing about the outcome.

In 2020, ScreenRant ranked "Equinox" the 15th best episode of all Star Trek franchise television episodes.

 Novel 
The episode was also written as a novel, "Equinox" by Diane Carey, based on the television episode. It was published by Pocket Books in 1999.

 Releases 
The first part of this episode "Equinox, Part I" was released on LaserDisc in Japan on June 22, 2001, as part of 5th Season vol.2, which included episodes from "Dark Frontier" to "Equinox, Part I".  The episode had two audio tracks, English and also Japanese. This set had 6 double sided 12" optical discs giving a total runtime of 552 minutes. This was the last season released on LaserDisc, so only the first half of "Equinox" was offered on LaserDisc.

Both parts of "Equinox" were released with "The Killing Game" on VHS in one set. Two other VHS tapes had one part each of "Equinox". One tape paired part I with "Warhead", and another tape paired part II with "Survival Instinct".

On November 9, 2004, "Equinox, Part I" was released as part of the season 5 DVD box set of Star Trek: Voyager''. The box set includes 7 DVD optical discs with all the episodes in season 5 with some extra features, and episodes have a Dolby Digital 5.1 surround sound audio track.

References

External links
 
 
  

Star Trek: Voyager (season 5) episodes
Star Trek: Voyager (season 6) episodes
1999 American television episodes
Star Trek: Voyager episodes in multiple parts
Films scored by Jay Chattaway
Television episodes written by Rick Berman
Television episodes written by Brannon Braga
Television episodes directed by David Livingston

it:Specie di Star Trek: Voyager#Ankari
hu:USS Equinox